Raņķi Parish is an administrative unit of Kuldīga Municipality in the Courland region of Latvia. The parish has a population of 507 (as of 1/07/2010) and covers an area of 46.48 km2.

Villages of Raņķi parish 
 Līdumnieki (Skrunda-2)
 Raņķi
 Smilgas

References

Parishes of Latvia
Kuldīga Municipality
Courland